Vlaardingen Oost is a metro station in Vlaardingen in the Netherlands. Located on the Hoekse Lijn, it is served by RET Metro Line B at all times, and Line A during peak periods.

History
Vlaardingen Oost was opened on 17 August 1891 as a local railway station on the Hoekse Lijn.

The Nederlandse Spoorwegen stopped operating the line, including the Vlaardingen Oost railway station, on 1 April 2017 to enable conversion for metro train operations. The station was reopened by RET on 30 September 2019, with preview services operating on 28 September. The station is still accessible for diesel trains, because nearby companies still require trains to deliver supplies.

The station was one of the first railway stations in The Netherlands to be built on a bridge.

Metro services
As of 2019, Vlaardingen Oost is served by 6 trains per hour on RET Metro Line B, of which 3 per hour travel the full length of the route, and 3 travel only as far as Steendijkpolder

During peak periods, the station is also served by 6 trains per hour on Line A, which travel as far as Vlaardingen West.

Bus services 
Bus services are operated by RET.

References

External links
 Dutch Public Transport journey planner

Rotterdam Metro stations
Railway stations opened in 1891
Railway stations on the Hoekse Lijn
Vlaardingen